Chiappa is an Italian surname. Notable people with the surname include:

Imelda Chiappa, Italian cyclist
Noel Chiappa, computer scientist and Internet pioneer
Roberto Chiappa, Italian cyclist

See also
Chiappa Firearms, Italian firearms manufacturing company

Italian-language surnames